Doomsday Hymn is a Brazilian Christian metal band, whose music incorporates metalcore, death metal, groove metal and thrash metal. They started making music together in 2013. They have released one studio album, Mene Tequel Ufarsim (2015), with Rottweiler Records.

Background
The band originated in Curitiba, Paraná, Brazil, where they formed in 2013. Their current members are vocalist, Gil Lopes, guitarists, Karim Serri and Angelo Torquetto, bassist, Allan Pavani, and drummer, Jarlisson Jaty, while their former members were guitarist, Roney Lopes, and bassist, Fernando Frogel.

Music history
The band are signed to Rottweiler Records. On 21 July 2015, they released, the studio album Mene Tequel Ufarsim.

Members
Current members
 Gil Lopes – vocals (2013–present)
 Jader Felippe - guitar
(March 18, 2019-present)
 Allan Pavani – guitar
(June 27, 2019-present), bass (2014-2016)
 Guilherme Fuse - bass
(June 11, 2019-present)
 Jarlisson Jaty – drums (2013–2016), (May 28, 2019-present)

Former members
 Roney Lopes – guitar (2013-2014)
 Fernando Frogel – bass (2013-2014)
 Karim Serri – guitar (May 2013-September 4, 2016)
 Angelo Torquetto – guitar (2014-September 4, 2016)
 Renato Ribeiro – guitar (December 8, 2018–June 27, 2019)
 João Rafael – bass (December 8, 2018–May 28, 2019)
 Jairo Messias – drums (December 8, 2018–May 28, 2019)

Timeline

Discography
Studio albums
 Mene Tequel Ufarsim (21 July 2015, Rottweiler)
EPs
 Doomsday Hymn (2013)
Live Sessions
08614/4 #LiveSession (2014)
Singles
"O Fim" (2018)
"Sujo/Imundo" (2019)

References

Brazilian musical groups
Musical groups established in 2013
Rottweiler Records artists
2013 establishments in Brazil